Angel Stoyanov Kariotov (1812 – ), also known as Angel Vojvoda (Ангел войвода), was one of the biggest voivods in Bulgarian history, who led the well-organized band in the regions of Plovdiv and Haskovo around 1832 and 1862. He was born in the Rodоpean village Dragoynovo in the Municipality Parvomay. The Angel peak in mount Rila is named after him. Angel Vojvoda was also a main contributor and initiator of the only Bulgarian monastery built during the Ottoman dominance - the Arapovo Monastery "St. Nedelya".

External links
 The restorated tower of Angel Vojvoda

1812 births
1860s deaths
Year of death missing
People from Parvomay
Bulgarian revolutionaries
19th-century Bulgarian people